Tropiduchus is a genus of planthoppers (order Hemiptera), recorded from Africa and Malesia.

Taxonomy
Tropiduchus is the type genus of the family Tropiduchidae subfamily Tropiduchinae and tribe Tropiduchini (erected later by Carl Stål in 1866).  The genera currently placed in the Tropiduchini, recorded from Africa, Asia and Australia, are:

 Antabhoga Distant, 1912
 Bitara Stroinski & Szwedo, 2021
 Daradacella Fennah, 1949
 Daradax Walker, 1857
 Ficarasa Walker, 1857
 Haliartus (planthopper) Melichar, 1914
 Lavora Muir, 1931
 Leptotambinia Kato, 1931
 Leptovanua Melichar, 1914
 Macrovanua Fennah, 1950
 Montrouzierana Signoret, 1861
 Neocatara Distant, 1910
 Nesotemora Fennah, 1956
 Oechalina Melichar, 1914
 Oechalinella Wang, 2016
 Oligaethus Jacobi, 1928
 Peggioga Kirkaldy, 1905
 Peltodictya Kirkaldy, 1906
 Pseudoparicana Melichar, 1914
 Rhinodictya Kirkaldy, 1906
 Scenoma Fennah, 1969
 Swezeyaria Metcalf, 1946
 Thaumantia Melichar, 1914
 Thymbra (planthopper) Melichar, 1914
 Tropiduchus Stål, 1854
 Vanua (planthopper) Kirkaldy, 1906
 Varma (planthopper) Distant, 1906

Species
Fulgoromorpha Lists on the Web includes:

 Tropiduchus anceps Fennah, 1958
 Tropiduchus arisba Fennah, 1958
 Tropiduchus asturco Fennah, 1958
 Tropiduchus atlas Fennah, 1958
 Tropiduchus bifasciatus Van Stalle, 1985
 Tropiduchus castigator (Melichar, 1914)
 Tropiduchus castigatoria (Schmidt, 1918)
 Tropiduchus electra Fennah, 1957
 Tropiduchus fuscatus Melichar, 1914
 Tropiduchus ino Fennah, 1958
 Tropiduchus iphis Fennah, 1958
 Tropiduchus kupei Van Stalle, 1984
 Tropiduchus luridus (Walker, 1857)
 Tropiduchus marpsias Linnavuori, 1973
 Tropiduchus notatus Melichar, 1914
 Tropiduchus obiensis Melichar, 1914
 Tropiduchus pallidus Van Stalle, 1984
 Tropiduchus philippinus Melichar, 1914
 Tropiduchus silvicola Van Stalle, 1984
 Tropiduchus sobrinus Stål, 1854- type species (Africa)
 Tropiduchus subfasciata (Melichar, 1914)
 Tropiduchus variegata (Muir, 1931)

References

External Links

Tropiduchinae
Hemiptera of Africa
Hemiptera of Asia